The leadership of the Baháʼí Faith has created goal-oriented Baháʼí teaching plans, spanning 1–10 years each, to spread the Baháʼí Faith. The plans began in the 1930s and 1940s as teaching goals for certain countries and in 1953 became coordinated globally, often with a focus on sending travelling teachers to new countries. Shoghi Effendi initiated the plans before his death in 1957, and the Universal House of Justice has initiated the plans since 1964. From 1964–2000, there were six international Baháʼí teaching plans of varying lengths.

Since 2000, the plans have had a focus on Baháʼís becoming trained to facilitate "core activities" of devotional gatherings, classes for children and adolescents, and a systematic study known as "study circles", based on a series of workbooks by the Ruhi Institute. Starting with a one-year plan from 2021–2022, the Universal House of Justice has announced a 25-year-long series of plans ending in 2046. Currently, the international Baháʼí community is in the midst of a nine-year plan intended to last from 2022–2031.

Background
The Tablets of the Divine Plan, letters written by ʻAbdu'l-Bahá to the Baháʼís of North America, asked the followers of the religion to travel to other countries. Their publication was delayed in the United States until 1919 — after the end of the First World War and the Spanish flu. Following their publication the first Baháʼí permanent resident in South America, Leonora Armstrong, arrived in Brazil in 1921. Shoghi Effendi, who was named ʻAbdu'l-Bahá's successor, wrote a cable on  1 May 1936 to the Baháʼí Annual Convention of the United States and Canada, and asked for the systematic implementation of ʻAbdu'l-Bahá's vision to begin.

The multifaceted goals of Baháʼí teaching plans were discussed in a 1975 letter from the Universal House of Justice (the governing body of the world's Baháʼís since 1963):

In 2000, the Universal House of Justice published Century of Light, which reviewed the accomplishments and setbacks of the previous century. A major conclusion of the book was the need to focus on long-term teaching goals.

Plans under Shoghi Effendi

1st Seven Year Plan (1937–1944)
A cable to American Baháʼís was sent by Shoghi Effendi on 19 May 1936 calling for permanent pioneers to be established in all the countries of Latin America. The Baháʼí National Spiritual Assembly of the United States and Canada was appointed the Inter-America Committee to take charge of the preparations. During the 1937 Baháʼí North American Convention, Shoghi Effendi cabled advising the convention to prolong their deliberations to permit the delegates and the National Assembly to consult on a plan that would enable Baháʼís to go to Latin America. In 1937 the First Seven Year Plan  (1937-44), which was an international plan designed by Shoghi Effendi, gave the American Baháʼís the goal of establishing the Baháʼí Faith in every country in Latin America. With the spread of American Baháʼís in Latin American, Baháʼí communities and Local Spiritual Assemblies began to form in 1938 across the region. The first pioneer to Chile arrived in 1940 when her ship docked at Arica. After arriving in Panama in 1940, the first Guaymí Baháʼí converted in the 1960s. In 1985-6 the "Camino del Sol" project included indigenous Guaymí Baháʼís of Panama traveling with the Venezuelan indigenous Carib speaking and Guajira Baháʼís through the Venezuelan states of Bolívar, Amazonas and Zulia sharing their religion.

British Six Year Plan (1944–1950)
In 1944, a pioneering movement began with sixty per cent of the British Baháʼí community eventually relocating. Internationally this effort would take the Baháʼí Faith to Scotland, Wales, and Ireland and raising the numbers of Local Assemblies in the British Isles. 

In 1950-1 the Baha'is of the British Isles pioneered to Tanganyika, Uganda, and Kenya. On August 3, 1951 pioneers arrived in Kampala from which pioneers went to French Equatorial Africa, and Cameroon and so on.

Ten Year Crusade (1953–1963)
In 1953, Shoghi Effendi launched the first worldwide, coordinated effort to expand the Baháʼí Faith, termed the Ten Year Crusade. The four primary goals of the Ten Year Crusade were outlined as follows by Shoghi Effendi:
The development of institutions at the Baháʼí World Centre;
Consolidation of the twelve countries where the Faith was well established;
Consolidation of all other territories already open; and
The opening of the remaining "chief virgin territories" around the globe.

This effort was launched in order to form Local Spiritual Assemblies and National Spiritual Assemblies all over the world so that the Universal House of Justice could be elected that would be representative of a worldwide Baháʼí membership. From 1953 to 1963, some 250 Americans and Persians moved to many locations around the world as part of the Ten Year Crusade. Almost every country in the world which had no Baháʼís was at least visited by a travelling teacher.

Following Shoghi Effendi's death in 1957, the Hands of the Cause continued the Ten Year Crusade following his instructions until the formation of the Universal House of Justice, which remains the highest elected body of the Baháʼí Faith, in 1963. After its election, the Universal House of Justice wrote:
"The rightness of the time was further confirmed by references in Shoghi Effendi's letters to the Ten Year Crusade's being followed by other plans under the direction of the Universal House of Justice. ..."
(Messages from the Universal House of Justice, 1963-1986, p. 50)

The efforts of the Ten Year Crusade were followed by large enrollments to the Baháʼí Faith in some parts of the world. For example, wide-scale growth in the religion was observed across Sub-Saharan Africa.

The title Knight of Baháʼu'lláh was given by Shoghi Effendi, Guardian of the Baháʼí Faith in the period, to Baháʼís who arose to open new territories to the Faith starting in the Ten Year Crusade.

Shoghi Effendi kept a Roll of Honour of all the Knights of Baháʼu'lláh. While inaugurated during the Ten Year Crusade, local restrictions caused some of the goals to remain unfilled. The final Knight of Baháʼu'lláh arrived at Sakhalin Island in December 1990. There were 254 total Knights of Baháʼu'lláh that settled in 121 localities, they had been sent to open 131 nations and territories of which 10 had already been opened. On 28 May 1992, during the commemoration of the centenary of the ascension of Baháʼu'lláh, the Roll of Honour was deposited by Rúhíyyih Khanum at the entrance door of the Shrine of Baháʼu'lláh. See a list here.

Plans under the Universal House of Justice
Since its first election in 1963, the Universal House of Justice has overseen a series of international Baháʼí teaching plans. Up to the year 2000, there were six of these: the Nine Year Plan (1964–73), the Five Year Plan (1974–1979), the Seven Year Plan (1979–1986), the Six Year Plan (1986–1992), the Three Year Plan (1993–1996), and the Four Year Plan (1996–2000). The Four Year Plan focused on strengthening "communities, institutions, and believers".

The Universal House of Justice announced in 1999 that the period from 2000–2021 would consist of a series of plans aimed at increasing the rate of conversions to the Baháʼí Faith: a Twelve Month Plan (2000–2001) followed by four Five Year Plans (2001–2006, 2006–2011, 2011–2016, and 2016–2021). The Twelve Month Plan focused on creating activities and further building an administrative structure. In this time the Regional Baháʼí Council (RBC) was created in very large countries, where an intermediary was necessary between the National and Local to help National Assemblies communicate and interact with local communities. From 2001 to 2006, the Five Year Plan has focused on three so-called core activities, which comprise devotional gatherings, children's classes, and study circles. An additional aspect newly created was the categorizing of areas into "clusters" that comprise groupings of communities, such as a metropolitan area or county. From 2006 to 2011 the Five Year Plan introduced Junior Youth Activities recognizing the pre-adolescent years as crucial in a person's spiritual growth. For the 2011–2016 teaching plan, a three-tier system of ranking for "clusters" (relatively small geographic areas) was introduced, based on the number of activities taking place and the number of participants involved. The Baháʼí teaching plan from April 2016 to April 2021 had a goal to bring the number of clusters with an advanced level of activity to 5,000 globally.

A one-year Baháʼí teaching plan was launched in 2021 by the Universal House of Justice's annual Ridván message to the worldwide Baháʼí community. This was followed by the beginning of a nine-year teaching plan launched in 2022's Ridván message. These two teaching plans are intended as the first two in a longer series of plans covering the period of 2021–2046.

Baháʼí terminology

Pioneering
The term pioneer is used among Baháʼís to describe someone who moves to a new area or country for the purpose of teaching the Baháʼí Faith. The first pioneer to enter a country or region mentioned in ʻAbdu'l-Bahá's Tablets of the Divine Plan is given the title of Knight of Baháʼu'lláh.

The following is a letter written on behalf of Shoghi Effendi to an individual regarding the term missionary:
"He sees no objection to the word Missionary appearing on your passport as long as it is clearly understood what kind of a 'missionary' a Baháʼí pioneer is. In the best and highest sense of the term it certainly could be applied to our teachers. Unfortunately this word has often been associated with a narrow-minded, bigoted type of proselytizing quite alien to the Baháʼí method of spreading our teachings."

Baháʼís do not consider pioneering to be proselytism, a term which often implies the use of coercion to convert someone to a different religion. However, sociologist Margit Warburg writes that Baháʼí pioneering is a form of organized proselytism similar to systems of organized proselytism in other religions.

Entry by troops
Entry by troops is a term used in the Baháʼí Faith to describe a process of expansion when the religion would emerge from relative obscurity as a "steady flow of reinforcements" of "troops of peoples of divers nations and races" would embrace it. It first appeared in Baháʼu'lláh's Súriy-i-Haykal.

Entry by troops is seen as a process, not a singular event. It is seen as foreshadowing of a large-scale embracing of the Baha'i Faith, when a majority of the world will recognize and accept the teachings of Baha'u'llah. As Shoghi Effendi wrote,
"This flow, moreover, will presage and hasten the advent of the day which, as prophesied by  ʻAbdu'l-Bahá, will witness the entry by troops of peoples of divers nations and races into the Baháʼí world — a day which, viewed in its proper perspective, will be the prelude to that long-awaited hour when a mass conversion on the part of these same nations and races, and as a direct result of a chain of events, momentous and possibly catastrophic in nature and which cannot as yet be even dimly visualized, will suddenly revolutionize the fortunes of the Faith, derange the equilibrium of the world, and reinforce a thousandfold the numerical strength as well as the material power and the spiritual authority of the Faith of Baháʼu'lláh."
(1953, Shoghi Effendi, “Citadel of Faith: Messages to America 1947-1957”, p. 117)

A letter written to a Baháʼí on behalf of Shoghi Effendi has a section that gives a clear perspective of the Baháʼí attitude toward mass conversion.
It is not sufficient to number the souls that embrace the Cause to know the progress that it is making. The more important consequences of your activities are the spirit that is diffused into the life of the community, and the extent to which the teachings we proclaim become part of the consciousness and belief of the people that hear them. For it is only when the spirit has thoroughly permeated the world that the people will begin to enter the Faith in large numbers. At the beginning of the spring only the few, exceptionally favoured seeds will sprout, but when the season gets in its full sway, and the atmosphere gets permeated with the warmth of true springtime, then masses of flowers will begin to appear, and a whole hillside suddenly blooms. We are still in the state when only isolated souls are awakened, but soon we shall have the full swing of the season and the quickening of whole groups and nations into the spiritual life breathed by Baháʼu'lláh." 
(Letter 18 February 1932, on behalf of Shoghi Effendi)

See also
 History of the Baháʼí Faith
 Baháʼí Faith by country

Notes

References

Further reading

External link
Visual overview of the Baha'i Cycle, Era, Ages, Epochs and Plans

Bahá'í terminology